The 1891 Waikato by-election was a by-election held on 6 October 1891 during the 11th New Zealand Parliament in the Waikato electorate of .

The by-election was caused by the resignation of the incumbent MP John Bryce.

The by-election was won by Edward Lake, who beat former MP William Murray.

Results

References

Waikato 1891
1891 elections in New Zealand
Politics of Waikato